The 1983 FIBA Under-19 World Championship (Spanish: 1983 Campeonato Mundial FIBA Sub-19) was the 2nd edition of the FIBA U19 World Championship. It was held in Palma de Mallorca, Spain from 14 to 28 August 1983.

The United States successfully defended their championship by winning the Gold Medal against the Soviet Union in the final day of the tournament, 82-78.

Qualification

Preliminary round

Group A

Group B

Group C

Final round

Classification 9th-14th

Semifinal round

Bronze medal match

Final

Final standings

Awards

References

FIBA Under-19 Basketball World Cup
1983 in basketball
1983 in Brazilian sport
International basketball competitions hosted by Spain
Sport in Palma de Mallorca
August 1983 sports events in Europe